Hormonotus is a genus of snakes.  At present, this genus is monotypic, as there is only one commonly accepted species in it, Hormonotus modestus, commonly known as the Uganda house snake or yellow forest snake. It is widespread in tropical Africa. Its sister taxon is Inyoka swazicus, the Swazi rock snake.

Distribution
The snake is found in Angola, the Democratic Republic of the Congo (DRC), Republic of Congo (RoC − Brazzaville), Gabon, Liberia, Sierra Leone, Uganda and some other parts of Africa.

References

Lamprophiidae
Monotypic snake genera
Snakes of Africa
Reptiles of Angola
Reptiles of Cameroon
Vertebrates of the Central African Republic
Reptiles of the Democratic Republic of the Congo
Reptiles of Equatorial Guinea
Reptiles of Gabon
Reptiles of West Africa
Reptiles of the Republic of the Congo
Reptiles of Uganda
Taxa named by Edward Hallowell (herpetologist)
Reptiles described in 1854